Alireza Novin (born 27 February 1961) is the former mayor of Tabriz, Iran. He was elected as 54th Mayor of Tabriz on 15 December 2005 by City Council and was inaugurated as mayor on 1 January 2006 in Saat City Hall.His tenure in Tabriz Municipality ended in 2013. He is graduated from Tabriz University in management.

References

External links
 

1961 births
Living people
People from Tabriz
University of Tabriz alumni
Mayors of Tabriz
Imam Hossein University alumni